The Jardin botanique pyrénéen de Melles, also known as A Fleur de Montagne, is a botanical garden specializing in plants of the Pyrenees. It is located in Melles, Haute-Garonne, Midi-Pyrénées, France, and open mornings in the warmer months; an admission fee is charged.

The garden was first envisioned in 2002 by the Relais des Arts Culture et Nature, with a mission to create a botanical garden of plants endemic to the central Pyrenees. By early 2003, about a hundred species had been planted, and in 2005 the garden first opened to the public. Today it contains a number of sections for different environments: sunny, shady, bog, rock, and gravel, with a small stream as well.

See also 
 List of botanical gardens in France

References 
 Jardin botanique pyrénéen de Melles
 A Fleur de Montagne
 Botanic.com entry (French)
 BaLaDO.fr entry (French)

Pyrenees
Melles, Jardin botanique pyreneen de
Melles, Jardin botanique pyreneen de